The International Railway Bridge crosses the Niagara River between Fort Erie, Ontario, Canada and Buffalo, New York, United States

International Railway Bridge or International Railroad Bridge may also refer to:
 Eagle Pass Union Pacific International Railroad Bridge, crossing the Rio Grande between Eagle Pass, Texas, United States and Piedras Negras, Coahuila, Mexico
 Laredo International Railway Bridge 2, crossing the Rio Grande between Laredo, Texas, United States and Nuevo Laredo, Tamaulipas, Mexico
 Laredo–Colombia International Railway Bridge 3, crossing the Rio Grande between Laredo, Texas, United States and Nuevo Laredo, Tamaulipas, Mexico
 Presidio–Ojinaga International Rail Bridge, crossing the Rio Grande between Presidio, Texas, United States and Ojinaga, Chihuahua, Mexico 
 Sault Ste. Marie International Railroad Bridge, crossing the St. Marys River between Sault Ste. Marie, Michigan, United States and Sault Ste. Marie, Ontario, Canada
 Texas Mexican Railway International Bridge, crossing the Rio Grande between Laredo, Texas, United States and Nuevo Laredo, Tamaulipas, Mexico

See also
International Bridge (disambiguation)